Thomas Flawn VC (22 December 1857 – 19 January 1925) was an English recipient of the Victoria Cross, the highest and most prestigious award for gallantry in the face of the enemy that can be awarded to British and Commonwealth forces.

Details
Flawn was 21 years old, and a private in the 94th Regiment of Foot (later the Connaught Rangers), British Army during the campaign against Sekukuni, when the following deed took place for which he was awarded the VC.

On 28 November 1879 during an attack on Sekukuni's Town, South Africa, Private Flawn and another private (Francis Fitzpatrick) with six men of the Native Contingent, were with a lieutenant of the 1st Dragoon Guards when he was badly wounded. The natives carried the wounded officer at first, but when the party was pursued by about 30 of the enemy they deserted and the lieutenant would have been killed but for the gallantry of the two privates - who alternately carried him while the other covered the retreat by firing on the enemy.

References

External links
 VC Online
 

British recipients of the Victoria Cross
Connaught Rangers soldiers
1857 births
1925 deaths
People from Irthlingborough
People of the Sekukuni Campaign
King's Own Scottish Borderers soldiers
British Army personnel of the Anglo-Zulu War
British Army recipients of the Victoria Cross